Iowa is a town in Calcasieu Parish, Louisiana, United States. The population was 3,436 in 2020. It is part of the Lake Charles metropolitan statistical area.

History
The history of this region is filled with stories of the early Midwestern settlers from Kansas, Illinois and Iowa, of the Acadians (Cajuns), and of Jean Lafitte's pirates. The community of Iowa was developed in the mid-19th century.

The railroad that cut through this country brought settlers who were lured to the prairie land for rice farming, cattle raising and later oil fields. Much of southwest Louisiana was developed by the North American Land and Timber Co. Seaman A. Knapp, president of the Iowa State College of Agriculture, was engaged in 1885 to demonstrate the suitability of the region for rice production. Knapp attracted a number of Iowans to settle the area. The settlers were lured to this area by advertisements published in newspapers in the midwestern states.

Iowa experienced a growth boom when oil was struck in 1930 and oil companies came to try their luck in the Iowa oil and gas fields. Even though this was the Great Depression era, Iowa thrived as more men came to work in the oil fields.

Today, oil continues to be a vital part of the town's economy, as are farming and cattle.

The town of "Iowa" is actually pronounced with the long A sound at the end ("EYE-uh-way"), opposed to the pronunciation of the state of Iowa.

Geography
Iowa is located along the eastern edge of Calcasieu Parish at  (30.237433, -93.014191). The eastern border of the town is the Jefferson Davis Parish line.

Demographics

As of the 2020 United States census, there were 3,436 people, 1,211 households, and 812 families residing in the town.

Transportation 
U.S. Route 90 passes through the center of town as 4th Street, and Interstate 10 passes along the northern edge, with access from exits 43 and 44. The southern terminus of U.S. Route 165 is at US 90 on the eastern town border.

Notable person
 Tierre Brown, National Basketball Association player and MVP of the NBA Development League in 2004

References

External links
 Town of Iowa official website
 Iowa, Louisiana, at City-Data.com
 ePodunk: Profile for Iowa, Louisiana

Towns in Calcasieu Parish, Louisiana
Towns in Louisiana
Towns in Lake Charles metropolitan area